

List of rulers of Gonja, a kingdom located in the north of Ghana

(Dates in italics indicate de facto continuation of office)

See also
Ghana
Gold Coast
Lists of office-holders

Rulers
Lists of African rulers